Scozzafava is a surname, and may refer to;

Nickname or occupational name for someone who removed beans from their pods, from Italian scozzare ‘to shell’ and fava ‘bean’.

Dede Scozzafava, American politician
Ralph Scozzafava, American business executive

Italian-language surnames